Jon Yasuhiro Nakamatsu (born 1968, San Jose, California) is an American classical pianist who resides in San Jose.

About 
He is the son of David Y. Nakamatsu, a San Jose electrical engineer, and Karen F. Maeda Nakamatsu, a city employee. He was raised in nearby Sunnyvale, California and attended Prospect  High School and Stanford University before becoming a German teacher at St. Francis High School in Mountain View.

In June 1997 Nakamatsu won the Gold Medal at the Tenth Van Cliburn International Piano Competition in Fort Worth, Texas. He was the first American to win this prize since 1981. Immediately following the competition, he quit his job as a high school German teacher to pursue a career as a classical pianist. He did not attend a music conservatory or major in music while he attended college and graduate school.

During the summer of 2005, Nakamatsu toured with the San Jose Youth Symphony in Spain, performing the Rachmaninoff Piano Concerto No. 2, and in June 2007, he toured with the Peninsula Youth Orchestra to Budapest, Prague, and Teplice playing the same piece. During the summer of 2008, he also toured with the Stanford Symphony Orchestra to China, playing Gershwin's "Rhapsody in Blue."

Education 
 Studied piano privately with Marina Derryberry since age 6 (1974).
 Graduated from Prospect High School, Saratoga, California, 1986
 A.A. Associate of Arts degree, Foothill College (community college), Los Altos Hills, California, 2000 (officially awarded long after degree requirements met)
 B.A. Bachelor of Arts degree in German Studies, Stanford University, California, 1991
 M.A. Master of Arts degree in Education, Stanford Graduate School of Education, California, 1992

Career 
 May–June 2007: Regular Jury member, Fifth International Piano Competition for Outstanding Amateurs, Fort Worth, Texas
 2006-current: Co-Artistic Director of Cape Cod Chamber Music Festival (with Jon Manasse)
 June 2000: Regular Jury member (preliminaries only), Second International Piano Competition for Outstanding Amateurs, Fort Worth, Texas
 June 1999: Regular Jury member (all three rounds), First International Piano Competition for Outstanding Amateurs, Fort Worth, Texas
 1997–current: Full-time pianist
 1991–1997: German language teacher at Saint Francis High School in Mountain View, California and part-time pianist.

Debuts

Trivia 
 Named Debut Artist of the Year in 1998 by National Public Radio’s Performance Today
 Was featured in Reader's Digest in June 1998
 Has been profiled on CBS Sunday Morning

Discography 

Nakamatsu is featured in the documentary movie "Playing with Fire":  The Tenth Van Cliburn International Piano Competition, which aired on PBS television and is available on DVD.

Awards

References

External links 
 Jon Nakamatsu official web site
 Hear Jon Nakamatsu in concert from WGBH Boston
 Van Cliburn Foundation
 Harmonia Mundi
 youtube

American classical pianists
Male classical pianists
American male pianists
American classical musicians of Japanese descent
Foothill College alumni
Musicians from San Jose, California
Pupils of Leonard Stein
Stanford University alumni
Living people
1968 births
Stanford Graduate School of Education alumni
Prize-winners of the Van Cliburn International Piano Competition
20th-century American pianists
People from Sunnyvale, California
Classical musicians from California
21st-century classical pianists
20th-century American male musicians
21st-century American male musicians
21st-century American pianists